Aki is a fictional character created for the 1967 James Bond film You Only Live Twice. In the film, Aki, played by Akiko Wakabayashi, is a female ninja agent with the fictional Japanese Secret Intelligence Service (SIS).

Creation 

Aki does not appear in Ian Fleming's 1964 novel. She was originally named Suki in Roald Dahl's screenplay. According to The James Bond Films, the character was "Dahl's tribute to the Japanese woman of the Sixties". The character is portrayed as an attractive female Japanese SIS agent, a skilled ninja and an expert driver who often uses her skills at driving her white Toyota 2000GT sports car equipped with several high-tech communication devices.

Mie Hama was cast to play Suki, but she had trouble learning English; to solve the problem, she and Akiko Wakabayashi, originally cast to play the part of almost-silent Kissy Suzuki, decided to swap their respective roles. Wakabayashi then convinced director Lewis Gilbert to change the name of her character to Aki.
While Kissy acts as the film's main Bond girl, Aki serves as Bond's main contact and apparent love interest during the early and middle sections. When Kissy is set to be introduced as Bond's cover wife, Aki's role draws to a close. Her death shortly afterwards clears the way for Kissy to take on the role.

Character  
Aki is first seen when 007 meets her at a sumo wrestling show. Bond is there to meet a contact who will take him to Mr. Henderson, M's recommended contact in Japan. He confirms that Aki is his contact by saying the code words "I love you" to her. Aki takes Bond to meet Henderson in her car. After Henderson is killed during their meeting, Bond attacks and kills one of Henderson's killers. Taking the man's place, he is driven to the Osato Chemical Works HQ, where he is discovered by the villains. Aki rescues him, using her skills as a driver, then takes him to meet her boss, Tiger Tanaka. It is after this meeting that a bikini-clad Aki invites Bond to spend the night with her, famously saying "I think I will enjoy very much serving under you", before Bond carries her to bed.

The next morning, Bond returns to the Osato Chemical Works and meets Blofeld's henchman Mr Osato. Leaving after the meeting, he is pursued by SPECTRE gunmen, from whom Aki rescues him again. The gunmen chase Aki's car and she leads them out into the countryside, where a SIS helicopter lifts the gunmen's car off the road with a giant magnet and drops it into the sea (in 2012, Complex ranked it as the sixth best James Bond chase scene). She then takes him to a quayside to investigate a ship he suspects is being used by the villains. When investigating the ship Bond and Aki are attacked by SPECTRE henchmen. Bond tells her to leave and report to Tanaka; Aki refuses to leave Bond at first, but eventually complies.

Aki next appears after Bond is captured and almost killed by Helga Brandt, when she meets with him back at Tanaka's headquarters and Bond is about to go on another mission that she cannot accompany him on.

When Bond returns to the base in Kyoto, Aki meets him there to discuss the plan to disrupt SPECTRE's plot. She had hoped to play the part of Bond's "wife" in the cover operation, however this was vetoed as she was not a native of the Ama island.

This proves to be a fortunate decision as Aki never makes it to the island at all. On Blofeld's orders Osato had sent ninja assassins to kill Bond, one of whom stealthily enters the bedroom where Bond and Aki are sleeping together and tries to poison Bond by dripping poison down a thread. (Dahl took inspiration for this by watching a similar scene in the first film in the Shinobi no Mono ninja film series.)

Bond, however, moves in his sleep. At the last moment Aki moves to his position, unwittingly takes the poison instead, and dies after a brief struggle for breath. The scene was accompanied by the musical track "The Death of Aki" by John Barry.

Reception 
Various lists frequently ranked Aki among the best Bond girls ever, including as tenth by Zimbio in 2008 ("So beautiful you almost forget that Sean Connery has been ridiculously made up to look Japanese. Almost"), ninth by Postmedia News the same year ("Kissy Suzuki is considered the 'main' Bond girl in this film, but Aki has a bigger role and is more memorable"), and eight by WagerWeb in 2009 ("Hot Japanese agent, she kicks ass and look damn fine doing it. Besides, she dies to save James Bond, you have to give her some extra credit for that"). According to UGO, "although Akiko Wakabayashi is charming in the role, her chemistry with Bond is disappointing, and she lacks both the look and the attitude to make her a good Bond girl," but in another article UGO praised her as "Bond's super-hot guardian angel". Den of Geek included her in their 2008 list of ten James Bond characters who deserve their own spin-off. Esquire magazine dubbed Aki "the Girl Friday of Tiger Tanaka" and "Tiger's Pussycat".

References 

Bond girls
Film characters introduced in 1967
Fictional Japanese people
Fictional female ninja
Fictional secret agents and spies
Fictional women soldiers and warriors
You Only Live Twice (film)